Goniotorna is a genus of moths belonging to the subfamily Tortricinae of the family Tortricidae.

Species
Goniotorna angusta Diakonoff, 1960
Goniotorna chersopis Meyrick, 1933
Goniotorna chondrocentra Diakonoff, 1973
Goniotorna decipiens Diakonoff, 1960
Goniotorna deinozona Diakonoff, 1973
Goniotorna erratica (Diakonoff, 1948)
Goniotorna heteropa Diakonoff, 1960
Goniotorna iecoricolor Diakonoff, 1960
Goniotorna illustra Diakonoff, 1960
Goniotorna insatiata Diakonoff, 1973
Goniotorna irresoluta Diakonoff, 1960
Goniotorna lacrimosa Diakonoff, 1960
Goniotorna leucophrys Diakonoff, 1960
Goniotorna macula Diakonoff, 1970
Goniotorna megalogonia Diakonoff, 1960
Goniotorna melanoconis Diakonoff, 1960
Goniotorna mesostena Diakonoff, 1963
Goniotorna mianta Diakonoff, 1973
Goniotorna micrognatha Diakonoff, 1960
Goniotorna mucida Diakonoff, 1960
Goniotorna niphotoma Diakonoff, 1960
Goniotorna pleuroptila (Meyrick, 1937)
Goniotorna polyops Diakonoff, 1960
Goniotorna praeornata Diakonoff, 1960
Goniotorna praerupta Diakonoff, 1960
Goniotorna rhodolemma Diakonoff, 1960
Goniotorna rhodoptila Diakonoff, 1960
Goniotorna suspiciosa Diakonoff, 1960
Goniotorna synastra (Meyrick, 1918)
Goniotorna trignoma Diakonoff, 1973
Goniotorna trigodes Diakonoff, 1973
Goniotorna vadoni Diakonoff, 1960
Goniotorna valentini Karisch, 2008
Goniotorna verticillata Diakonoff, 1960
Goniotorna vinacea Diakonoff, 1960
Goniotorna vulpicolor Diakonoff, 1960

See also
List of Tortricidae genera

References

 , 2008, Lambillionea (Tome II) 108 (1): 83-94 
 , 1933, Exotic Microlepid. 4: 423
 ,2005 World Catalogue of Insects 5

External links
tortricidae.com

 
Archipini
Tortricidae genera